Kagney Linn Karter (born March 28, 1987) is an American pornographic actress, stripper, singer and model.

Early life
Karter was born in Harris County, Texas and raised in St. Joseph, Missouri and Ridgway, Pennsylvania.

Career
Karter began erotic dancing while in Missouri and was named the state's Déjà Vu Showgirl of the Year in 2007. She later moved to California to pursue an acting and singing career. Karter fell out with her manager when he discovered she had been working as an exotic dancer. While continuing to dance in California, she eventually moved into modeling and, after signing with the agency LA Direct Models, posed for shoots with erotic photographer Holly Randall.

Karter entered the adult film industry in September 2008. Her first scene was with Johnny Sins for Naughty America. In 2009, she was chosen as the Penthouse Pet of the Month for June, and appeared on the covers of Hustler in April and Adult Video News in June.

She also was featured on the cover of Holly Randall's photo book Erotic Dream Girls, which was published in October 2009. In January 2010, she signed an exclusive performing contract with the production company Zero Tolerance Entertainment.

In 2012, Karter took part in Louis Theroux's Twilight of the Porn Stars, a BBC documentary film about the porn industry, its struggle to compete with free internet alternatives, and the lives of famous porn stars.

Karter released an extended play (EP) recording entitled "The Crossover" in 2018.  In 2022, Karter released her second EP, titled "The Take Over."

Awards

References

External links

 
 
 
 

1987 births
American female erotic dancers
American erotic dancers
American female adult models
American pornographic film actresses
Living people
Penthouse Pets
People from Harris County, Texas
Pornographic film actors from Texas
21st-century American women